Videograf Productions is an underground video magazine series that documents the U.S. graffiti subculture. Videograf was founded in 1989 by two former New York city graffiti writers Carl Weston and Colin "KoolSpin" Turner. The inspiration for the Videograf series came during the summer of 1988, from the graffiti zine movement. It was publications like New York City's "International Graffiti Times" published by David Schmidlapp and Phase2 and the first color graffiti zine from Los Angeles - "Can Control Magazine" published by Power that planted the idea of doing a videotape version of a fan zine. By February 1989 Videograf issue one was in full production. By the summer of 1989, photographer and graffiti artist William "Nic One" Green joined the Videograf team as a producer. A year later the future cofounder of Egotrip magazine, writer and television producer Sacha Jenkins joined Videograf as well. The Videograf Productions operation was run out of Henry Chalfant's studio at 64 Grand Street for about 3 years before moving to Greenpoint Brooklyn.

Overview
Videograf Productions was the first group to produce a recurring video series on the graffiti scene. Most films on graffiti up to this point were traditional documentaries. Videograf Productions used a video magazine format to profile graffiti artists and graffiti bombers. The Videograf series was unusual in that it was produced by active and former graffiti writers. At the time, most people documenting urban culture tended to be from outside the culture. The Videograf series wasn't neutral in how it covered graffiti; it as pro-graffiti from the very start. Carl Weston was very aggressive in documenting the new clean train movement that had started in New York City after the last train with graffiti was pulled from service in April 1989. Graffiti artists and bombers like Ven, Ket and many others would make it their mission to get graffiti back on the New York City transit system. The number one thing that would get Videograf Productions into legal conflicts with the New York City Police Department was the inclusion of clean train bombing.

To date, Videograf Productions has produced and distributed over 20 graffiti videos.
The original Videograf video series, and later the Graf Core and OverSpray series included interviews with many well known graffiti
artists including Zephyr, PHASE 2, Lee Quiñones, Pjay, Ket, Ghost, JA, Death149, Risk, Cope2, Sharp, Reas, Serve, Web, Espo, Kaws, Dash "Sace" Snow and
Dream.

Police harassment, arrest and civil rights lawsuit
On May 26, 2000 the Police Department's Bronx Vandal Squad unit executed a search warrant on Videograf Productions as they were prepping the release of their newest video titled Graf Core 2000. This police action and the confiscation of Videograf Productions entire videotape archive would delay Graf Core 2000 from being released for almost 4 years. A few months after the warrant was executed the Bronx Vandal Squad arrested William Green and Carl Weston for blurring an image used in the video Graf Core 1.0. The official charge was hindering a criminal investigation. This charge was dropped by the judge the next day. Videograf Productions was able to enlist the help of the ACLU's Norman Siegel and later Earl Ward to represent them in a civil rights lawsuit against the City of New York. Carl Weston went to the Bronx Vandal Squad headquarters a few months after the first search warrant in an attempt to get an on camera interview with anyone from the Vandal Squad, Carl Weston ended up running into officer Joseph "Joe Blow" Rivera, the interview didn't go very well. The very next day after the failed interview, the Bronx Vandal Squad executed a second search warrant, Carl Weston feels this was largely an act of revenge for videotaping Joseph "Joe Blow" Rivera face. Four years later the city settled out of court with Videograf Productions.

Videography
 Videograf Issue # 1 (1989) - Featuring Phase2, Henry Chalfant, William "Nic One" Green, Priz-One, Sein5, Visim, Death149
 Videograf Issue # 2 (1990) - JA, King Bee, Scope, Mars, Take5, Bom5, FuzzOne, Death149
 Videograf Issue # 3 (1991) - Ket, Slick, Dream, Power, Risk, Charlie
 Videograf Issue # 4 (1991) - MQ, King Bee, Vase, Lady Di
 Videograf Issue # 5 (1992) - Ghost, Ket, Zeno, Bruz, Free5, Gaze, Emit, Imok Crew
 Videograf Issue # 6 (1992) - Cope2, Dero & Med, Ryze, Shone, WebTC5, Asis, Kaves, Lordz of Brooklyn,
 Videograf Issue # 7 (1993) - Kaws, Pheen, Massive, Sub, Emit, Snow, Pkay, TDee
 Videograf Issue # 8 (1993) - Dream, King 157, Just, Tyke, Haze, Awr Crew, Greed, Waqs (Cortes)
 Videograf Issue # 9 (1994) - Cost, Set, Serve, Louie 167, Zephyer, Giz, Kech, Yes2
 Out Ta Bomb Issue # 1 (1994) - Ae.One, Web 113, Joust, Ryno
 Out Ta Bomb Issue # 2 (1995) - AKS
 Graf Core 1.0 (1999) - Espo, Ader, Keeps, Scant
 Graf Core 2000 (2004) - Featuring Cope2, Nace, Chip, Semz, Spek BTC, Dash "Sace" Snow, Year
 OverSpray 1.0 (2005)
 Videograf 10 - 20th Anniversary DVD (2010) - Featuring Lee Quiñones, Queen Andrea, Acet, Siek FLYID

Upcoming releases
 Videograf Productions is now in pre-production on Videograf 11.

References
 Vikki Tobak (1991) Group Videos Outlaw Graffiti Paper Magazine. Retrieved 2012-17-05.''''
 Bennet, James (26 July 1992) "New Weapon In Graffiti War: Scratch Resistant Glass" The New York Times. Retrieved 2012-13-05. Elliott Wilson (March 1995) "The Great Graffiti Bust" Vibe Magazine Page 32. Retrieved 2012-13-05. Moyhihan, Colin (11 June 2000) "Neighbor Report: Ridgewood;Police In Graffiti War, Seize An Artist's Videotapes" The New York Times. Retrieved 2012-13-05. Videograf Productions (2000) Attempted interview with Joseph "Joe Blow" Rivera Youtube.com Retrieved 2012-20-05. Vanairsdale, T.S. (15 October 2006) "Graffiti Cinema Turns Moody" The New York Times. Retrieved 2012-13-05. Lueck, Thomas (19 April 2007) "Graffiti Figure Admired As Artist New Faces Vandalism" The New York Times. Retrieved 2012-13-05. Videograf 10 (2010) Interview with Videograf Productions vimeo.com Retrieved 2012-20-05. Complex Magazine (25 April 2012) The 50 Biggest Street Art Arrests. Complex.com Retrieved 2012-19-05.''
 Narrative.ly (12 March 2014) Live From The Graffiti Underground. "Narrative.ly Retrieved 2014-30-03."

External links
 http://www.videografproductions.net
 Videograf Productions on Twitter
 Videograf Productions on Facebook
 Videograf Productions on YouTube
 Videograf Productions on Tumblr

Companies based in New York City
Graffiti in the United States